Andrés Alejandro Montiel (born 24 August 1993) is an Argentine footballer who plays as a left-back or centre-back.

Career
Montiel began his career with Primera B Nacional side Atlético Tucumán, after appearing on the bench once during the 2012–13 season he made his debut for the club on 8 June 2014 in a league match versus Sportivo Belgrano. Later that month, Montiel joined Torneo Federal A team San Jorge on loan. He made two appearances during the 2014 season prior to participating in twenty-six games in 2015, in the first of those twenty-six appearances he received his first career red card in a game against Altos Hornos Zapla. Montiel returned to San Jorge in June 2018, before signing for Torneo Regional Federal Amateur's Güemes in December.

Career statistics
.

Honours
Atlético Tucumán
Primera B Nacional: 2015

References

External links
 

1993 births
Living people
Place of birth missing (living people)
Argentine footballers
Association football defenders
Primera Nacional players
Argentine Primera División players
Torneo Federal A players
Atlético Tucumán footballers
San Jorge de Tucumán footballers
People from Formosa Province